The 2019 FIBA Basketball World Cup qualification for the FIBA Europe region, began in August 2017 and concluded in February 2019. Contrary to previous years, no teams were automatically placed into the World Cup, so all FIBA Europe nations had to participate in qualification.

Format
FIBA Europe was allocated 12 berths at the World Cup. In total, 37 FIBA Europe teams took part in the qualification tournament. The qualification consisted of the following stages:
 Pre-Qualifiers: 13 teams that did not participate in EuroBasket 2017 took part. Eight teams had qualified for the first round. The remaining five teams were eliminated from the World Cup qualification and transferred to the first pre-qualifying round of EuroBasket 2021 qualification.
 First round: 24 teams that participated in EuroBasket 2017 and eight teams that advanced from Pre-Qualifiers were organized into eight groups of four. The top three teams of each group qualified for the second round. The remaining eight teams played at the second pre-qualifying round of EuroBasket 2021 qualification.
 Second round: The top 24 teams from the first round were organised into four groups of six, with results carried over from the first round. The top three teams of each group qualified for the World Cup. All 24 participants of the second round, automatically qualified for the EuroBasket 2021 qualification.

Schedule
The schedule of the competition was as follows.

Pre-Qualifiers
Teams that did not manage or did not apply to make EuroBasket 2017 played in the pre-qualifiers round. 13 teams participated in four home-and-away round robin groups, from 2 to 19 August 2017. Armenia made its debut in FIBA international competitions, while teams such as Denmark, Switzerland, Luxembourg and Cyprus did not participate in 2019 FIBA Basketball World Cup campaign. The draw to determine the groups was held in Prague, Czech Republic, on 10 December 2016.

The top two teams from each group qualified for the First round, determining the last eight spots in Division A. The other five teams (the bottom two teams from Group A + the bottom team from Groups B, C, and D) have been eliminated from the FIBA Basketball World Cup, and played in Division B of EuroBasket 2021 qualifying, starting with the pre-qualifiers first round.

Seeding
Pre-qualifiers were drawn on 10 December 2016. Seeding was based on the EuroBasket 2017 qualification record.

Notes

All times are local.

Group A

Group B

Group C

Group D

Qualifiers

First round
The 24 national teams that qualified for EuroBasket 2017 automatically qualified for this stage. They were joined by eight teams qualified through the Pre-Qualifiers. In total, 32 teams were divided into eight home-and-away round robin groups of four teams. The allocation of teams from the first round was determined on 24 August 2017, with the only restriction of not drawing Serbia and Kosovo in the same group.

Games were played during November 2017, February 2018, June 2018, and July 2018. The top three teams from each group advanced to the Second round. The bottom team from each group was eliminated from the 2019 FIBA Basketball World Cup and transferred to the Second Round of EuroBasket 2021.

Draw
There were two draws for the first round (group stage). The first one took place in Guangzhou on 6 May 2017 and involved only 24 teams directly qualified to this round as EuroBasket 2017 participants. The second draw was held in Munich on 24 August 2017, after Pre-Qualifiers was concluded and involved only 8 teams qualified from Pre-Qualifiers.

Seeding
Teams were seeded according to their performance at the latest FIBA Europe tournaments. They were divided into eight pots of four teams. Pots 1 to 6 involved all EuroBasket 2017 participants and were determined using the same seedings as Eurobasket 2017. Pot 7 was reserved for the Pre-Qualifiers group winners and pot 8 for the runners-up. Teams from pots 1, 4, 5, and 8 were drawn to Groups A, C, E, and G, while teams from pots 2, 3, 6, and 7 were drawn to Groups B, D, F, and H.

Group A

Group B

Group C

Group D

Group E

Group F

Group G

Group H

Second round
The top three teams from each group, from the previous round, were grouped with three top teams from another group. It was composed of four new, home-and-away, round robin groups of six teams. All results from the first round were carried over to the second round. Games were played in September 2018, November 2018, and February 2019. The top three teams from each group qualified for the 2019 FIBA Basketball World Cup.

Group I

Group J

Group K

Group L

References

External links
Official website

qualification
FIBA
Basketball competitions in Europe between national teams
2017–18 in European basketball
2018–19 in European basketball